Reichenbachia is a genus of flowering plants belonging to the family Nyctaginaceae, the family that also includes Bougainvillea. The genus contains the species Reichenbachia hirsuta Spreng.

See Also
 Reichenbachia: Orchids Illustrated and Described, by Frederick Sander

References

Nyctaginaceae
Caryophyllales genera